William Colvin may refer to:

 Bill Colvin (1934–2010), Canadian ice hockey player
 William Colvin (priest) (1858–1949), Anglican priest in Ireland